Shadow Hunter is a 13-episode documentary television series about the paranormal, hosted by Darryll Walsh, a ghost hunter, best-selling author, and doctor of parapsychology.

"Cases" presented in the series are from Walsh's own collection, news headlines, the internet, and parapsychological organizations that Walsh speaks to.

The series is produced in association with CHUM Television, and aired on Space in Canada.

References

CTV Sci-Fi Channel original programming
2005 Canadian television series debuts
2000s Canadian documentary television series
2006 Canadian television series endings